Township is a township in O'Brien County, Iowa, USA.

History
Liberty Township was organized in 1869.

References

Townships in O'Brien County, Iowa
Townships in Iowa